Daniel Mitchell may refer to:

Daniel S. Mitchell (1838–1929), American photographer
Daniel J. Mitchell (born 1958), American economist
Danny Mitchell (EastEnders), a fictional character from the BBC soap opera EastEnders
Danny Mitchell (fighter) (born 1986), MMA fighter
Danny Ray Mitchell (1943-2013), American politician
Danny Mitchell (musician), see Modern Man (band)
Dan Mitchell (musician), early member of American blues rock band ZZ Top